Cheryl Riley may refer to:
 Cheryl Pepsii Riley, American singer and actress
 Cheryl R. Riley, American furniture designer and artist